is an airline based in Amakusa, Kumamoto Prefecture, Japan. It operates regional services from and to Amakusa. Its main base is Amakusa Airfield, with a focus city in Kumamoto Airport.

History 
The airline was established on 12 October 1998 and started operations on 23 March 2000, with services from Amakusa to Fukuoka and Kumamoto. It is owned by the municipal government (80% stake) and Japan Airlines. On 1 October 2004, it began service between Kumamoto and Matsuyama. On 18 April 2006, it cumulatively carried over 50,000 passengers. On 1 September 2008, it stopped the service between Kumamoto and Matsuyama. Three days later, on 4 September, it began the service between Kumamoto and Kobe. On 31 March 2010, it stopped the service between Kumamoto and Kobe.

In 2015, Amakusa has been reported that the fleet with 1 of 2 ATR 42-600 has been delivered with another 3 options while the Dash 8 has been transferred to Oriental Air Bridge. Amakusa in the future can fly between Amakusa and Kagoshima, Amakusa and Miyazaki, Amakusa and Kochi, Oita and Osaka, Fukuoka and Osaka, Hiroshima and Osaka as well as Fukuoka and Tsushima.

Destinations

Amakusa Airlines serves the following destinations:

Fleet

Current fleet

The Amakusa Airlines fleet consists of the following aircraft (as of August 2019):

In August 2015, the airline received its first of two ATR 42-600 (48 seats) to replace the smaller Dash 8.

Former fleet
Amakusa Airlines has also operated the following aircraft in the past:

References

External links

Amakusa Airlines

Regional airlines of Japan
Airlines established in 1998
Japanese companies established in 1998
Transport in Kumamoto Prefecture